Mayara Magri is a Brazilian ballet dancer. She is a principal dancer at The Royal Ballet. Her promotion to principal dancer took effect in September 2021.

Early life and training
Magri was born and raised in Brazil. When she was eight, she received a scholarship to train at Petite Danse School in Rio de Janeiro. When she was sixteen, she won the Senior Age Division of the Youth America Grand Prix and the Prix de Lausanne Scholarship and Audience Prize in 2011. Though her teachers encouraged her to train in the United States, she chose to go to The Royal Ballet School in London. Magri, who was trained in the Vaganova method, had to adjust to British ballet.

Career
In 2012, at age 17, Magri was offered a contract to join the company. She was named First artist in 2015, Soloist in 2016, First Soloist in 2018 and Principal Dancer in 2021. She has danced roles such as Kitri in Don Quixote, Gamzatti in La Bayadere, Mitzi Caspar in Mayerling and Lescaut's Mistress in Manon. In June 2020, in the first series of performance since the Royal Opera House's closure due to the COVID-19 coronavirus pandemic, which was broadcast online, Magri and Matthew Ball performed an extract from Christopher Wheeldon's Within the Golden Hour, after learning the pas de deux in five days.

Selected repertoire
Magri's repertoire with The Royal Ballet includes:

References

Living people
Brazilian ballerinas
People educated at the Royal Ballet School
Principal dancers of The Royal Ballet
Brazilian expatriates in England
Prix de Lausanne winners
21st-century ballet dancers
21st-century Brazilian dancers
1994 births